Tommye Blount is a Black, queer poet from Detroit, Michigan. He is the author of the poetry collection Fantasia for the Man in Blue and the chapbook What Are We Not For. Fantasia for the Man in Blue was a 2020 National Book Award Finalist in the Poetry category.

Personal life
Blount was born in Detroit, Michigan. Blount attended Michigan State University for his undergraduate degree and earned an MFA from Warren Wilson College, graduating in 2013. He lives in Novi, Michigan.

Career
Blount is the author of the book Fantasia for the Man in Blue which was a finalist for the 2020 National Book Award for Poetry. He is also the author of the chapbook What Are We Not For.

Blount is a Cave Canem Fellow, a 2017 Literary Arts Fellow at Kresge Arts in Detroit, and a fellow of Bread Loaf Writer's Conference

Works

Poems
"The Pedestrian" (Academy of American Poets)
"The Bug" (Poetry, January 2015)
"The Tongue" (Poetry, January 2015)

Chapbooks
 What Are We Not For (2016, Bull City Press)

Books
 Fantasia for the Man in Blue (2020, Four Way Books)

Awards
2020 – National Book Award for Poetry, Finalist

External links
Poetry Foundation: Tommye Blount

References

Living people
21st-century American poets
LGBT African Americans
LGBT people from Michigan
American LGBT poets
American male poets
African-American poets
Year of birth missing (living people)
21st-century American male writers
Queer men
Queer poets
21st-century African-American writers
African-American male writers
Writers from Detroit